A Prayer Under Pressure of Violent Anguish is the second full-length album released by the metal band My Ruin.

Track listing
 "Morning Prayer" - 0:33
 "Beauty Fiend" - 3:41
 "Stick It to Me" - 3:02
 "Heartsick" - 3:01
 "Rockstar" - 3:37
 "Sanctuary" - 3:19
 "Miss Ann Thrope" (feat. Jessicka of Jack Off Jill) - 3:22
 "Hemorrhage" - 4:15
 "Letter to the Editor" - 3:22
 "Let It Rain" - 3:30
 "Post Noise Revelation" - 3:46
 "Do You Love Me" (Nick Cave and The Bad Seeds cover) - 4:19
 "Evening Prayer" - 4:01
 "My War" (Black Flag cover) - 2:02

Personnel
 Tairrie B – vocals, producer
 Mick Murphy – guitars, producer
 Meghan Mattex – bass guitar
 Chris Hamilton – drums
 Jessicka – guest vocals on "Miss Ann Thrope"
 Nick Raskulinecz – producer, sound engineer, mixer

References

My Ruin albums
2000 albums
Snapper Music albums
Spitfire Records albums
Albums produced by Nick Raskulinecz